Small World is a novel by Matt Beaumont, published in 2008. It tells the story of a group of people living in North London.

Characters
Kate Lister - Kate is a high-powered businesswoman who never spends too much money but is too focussed on her career to worry too much about her family. That is, until she is fired.
Marco Lister - Marco is Kate's quiet husband He becomes embroiled in a murder case after stalking Ali.
Christie - Christie is the Listers' Australian au pair who is anything but happy in England.
Ali Heath - Ali is a tough woman who cannot conceive and so has undergone IVF for the past five years to try to get pregnant. She owns the shop Heaven.
Paul Heath - Paul is Ali's journalist husband. He is very put-upon by Ali and is eventually killed in a hit and run.
Keith - Keith is a self-loathing policeman with a very bad temper who does some horrible things, including raping his girlfriend before leaving her and killing a man during a hit and run.
Siobhan Gethen - Siobhan is the best friend of Ali and slightly newer friend of Kate. She has four children.
Dom Gethen - Dom is Siobhan's minor celebrity husband. He is a stand-up comic who has appeared on many TV panel shows. He thinks Marco looks like a serial killer.
Pam - Pam is Keith's curvy girlfriend who wants confirmation that the relationship is moving forwards.
Janet Graham - Janet is a middle-aged woman who has come from Yorkshire to visit her ill husband in London.
Michele - Michele is a mixed-race girl in her late teens who seems to have a shady past but has put it (mostly) behind her to work with Ali in Heaven.
Steve - Steve is an alcoholic tramp who wanders North London causing havoc.
Rob - Rob is Keith's sex-mad colleague.
Jenka - Jenka is a Czech au pair who is saving up to get a nose job.
Carlton - Carlton is a black teenager. He is very tall with long hair and is always being arrested by the police for things he hasn't done.
Marcia - Marcia is Carlton's mother and a nurse at a NHS hospital. She is religious and worries a lot about her son.
Jaz - Jaz is a waiter in his father's Indian restaurant who dreams of becoming a stand-up comic.
362 - "362" is a Nigerian traffic warden who crops up a couple of times in the story and is beaten up at one point.

2008 novels
Novels set in London